Lanans is a commune in the Doubs department in the Bourgogne-Franche-Comté region in eastern France.

Geography
The commune is situated on the plateau above the valley of the Cusancin.

Population

Economy
The local economy is largely agricultural, including viticulture. Other commercial activities include forestry, transport, and masonry.

See also
 Communes of the Doubs department

References

External links

 Lanans on the intercommunal Web site of the department 

Communes of Doubs